Sperm mitochondrial-associated cysteine-rich protein is a protein that in humans is encoded by the SMCP gene.

Function 

Sperm mitochondria differ in morphology and subcellular localization from those of somatic cells. They are elongated, flattened, and arranged circumferentially to form a helical coiled sheath in the midpiece of the sperm flagellum. The protein encoded by this gene localizes to the capsule associated with the mitochondrial outer membranes and is thought to function in the organization and stabilization of the helical structure of the sperm's mitochondrial sheath.

References

Further reading 

 
 
 
 
 
 
 
 

Selenoproteins